Arifin Mohamed Siregar (11 February 1934 – 23 September 2019) was an Indonesian banker and politician who served as Minister of Trade, having previously been the Governor of the Bank Indonesia. He was born in Medan, and died, aged 85, in Jakarta.

References

1934 births
2019 deaths
Governors of Bank Indonesia
Government ministers of Indonesia
Trade ministers
20th-century Indonesian politicians
People from Medan